Eolamprogrammus is an extinct genus of prehistoric bony fish that lived during the Danian stage of the Paleocene epoch.

See also

 Prehistoric fish
 List of prehistoric bony fish

References

Paleocene fish
Ophidiiformes
Paleogene animals of Asia